Shingo Utsumi (born April 28, 1984) is a Japanese professional basketball player who plays for the Kyoto Hannaryz of the B.League in Japan.

Personal
His father, Tomohide Utsumi is a head coach for the Levanga Hokkaido.

Career statistics 

|-
| align="left" |  2007-08
| align="left" | Mitsubishi
| 25||  || 8.5|| .404|| .457|| .833|| 0.6|| 0.2|| 0.2|| 0.0||  2.5
|-
| align="left" |  2008-09
| align="left" | Mitsubishi
| 35||  || 19.4|| .383|| .364|| .714|| 1.3|| 1.0|| 0.4|| 0.1||  5.7
|-
| align="left" |  2009-10
| align="left" | Mitsubishi
| 40||  || 22.3|| .376|| .297|| .741|| 1.2|| 0.8|| 0.6|| 0.1||  7.9
|-
| align="left" | 2010-11
| align="left" | Mitsubishi
| 36||  || 22.4|| .337|| .267|| .786|| 1.8|| 0.9|| 0.4|| 0.2||  5.3
|-
| align="left" | 2011-12
| align="left" | Mitsubishi
| 42|| 7|| 18.2|| .387|| .360|| .824|| 1.3|| 0.6|| 0.3|| 0.1||  5.5
|-
| align="left" |  2012-13
| align="left" | Mitsubishi
| 41|| 29|| 20.0|| .416|| .404|| .529|| 1.1|| 0.6|| 0.4|| 0.1||  4.1
|-
| align="left" | 2013-14
| align="left" | Wakayama
| 53|| 28|| 21.1|| .417|| .382|| .679|| 1.3|| 1.2|| 0.3|| 0.1||  4.8
|-
| align="left" | 2014-15
| align="left" | Kyoto
| 52|| 22|| 20.1|| .419|| .446|| .778|| 1.5|| 1.1|| 0.6|| 0.1||  5.5
|-
| align="left" | 2015-16
| align="left" | Kyoto
| 51|| 51|| 25.1|| .405|| .420|| .813|| 2.2|| 1.0|| 0.4|| 0.1||  7.1
|-
| align="left" |  2016-17
| align="left" | Kyoto
| 60|| 41|| 25.5|| .365|| .363|| .855|| 2.0|| 0.4|| 0.6|| 0.1||  5.7
|-
| align="left" |  2017-18
| align="left" | Kyoto
| 60|| 4|| 18.5|| .384|| .387|| .898|| 1.2|| 0.6|| 0.5|| 0.1||  3.9
|-

References

1984 births
Living people
Tokai University alumni
Japanese men's basketball players
Kyoto Hannaryz players
Nagoya Diamond Dolphins players
Sportspeople from Hokkaido
Wakayama Trians players
Shooting guards